The Master and Margarita is a novel by Soviet writer Mikhail Bulgakov, written in the Soviet Union between 1928 and 1940 during Stalin's regime. A censored version, with several chapters cut by editors, was published in Moscow magazine in 1966–1967, after the writer's death, by his widow. The manuscript was not published as a book until 1967, in Paris. A samizdat version circulated that included parts cut out by official censors, and these were incorporated in a 1969 version published in Frankfurt. The novel has since been published in several languages and editions.

The story concerns a visit by the devil to the officially atheistic Soviet Union. The Master and Margarita combines supernatural elements with satirical dark comedy and Christian philosophy, defying categorization within a single genre. Many critics consider it to be one of the best novels of the 20th century, as well as the foremost of Soviet satires.

History 
Mikhail Bulgakov was a playwright and author. He started writing the novel in 1928, but burned the first manuscript in 1930 (just as his character The Master did) as he could not see a future as a writer in the Soviet Union at a time of widespread political repression. He restarted the novel in 1931. In the early 1920s, Bulgakov had visited an editorial meeting of an atheist journal. He is believed to have drawn from this to create the Walpurgis Night ball of the novel. He completed his second draft in 1936, by which point he had devised the major plot lines of the final version. He wrote another four versions. When Bulgakov stopped writing four weeks before his death in 1940, the novel had some unfinished sentences and loose ends.

A censored version, with about 12 percent of the text removed and more changed, was first published in Moskva magazine (no. 11, 1966 and no. 1, 1967). A manuscript was smuggled out of the Soviet Union to Paris, where the YMCA Press, celebrated for publishing the banned work of Aleksandr Solzhenitsyn, published the first book edition in 1967. The text, as published in the magazine Moskva in 1968, was swiftly translated into Estonian, remaining for decades the only printed edition of the novel in book form in the Soviet Union. The original text of all the omitted and changed parts, with indications of the places of modification, was printed and distributed by hand in the Soviet Union (in the dissident practice known as samizdat). In 1969, the publisher Posev (Frankfurt) printed a version produced with the aid of these inserts.

In the Soviet Union, the novel was first published in book form in Estonian in 1968 with some passages edited out. The first complete version, prepared by Anna Sahakyants, was published in Russian by Khudozhestvennaya Literatura in 1973. This was based on Bulgakov's last 1940 version, as proofread by the publisher. This version remained the canonical edition until 1989. The last version, based on all available manuscripts, was prepared by Lidiya Yanovskaya.

Plot 
The novel has two settings. The first is Moscow during the 1930s, where Satan appears at Patriarch's Ponds as Professor Woland. He is accompanied by Koroviev, a grotesquely dressed valet; Behemoth, a black cat; Azazello, a hitman; and Hella, a female vampire. They target the literary elite and Massolit, their trade union, whose headquarters is Griboyedov House. Massolit consists of corrupt social climbers: bureaucrats, profiteers, and cynics. The second setting is the Jerusalem of Pontius Pilate: Pilate's trial of Yeshua Ha-Notsri (Jesus of Nazareth), his recognition of an affinity with (and spiritual need for) Yeshua, and his reluctant acquiescence to Yeshua's execution.

Part one opens with a confrontation between Berlioz (the head of Massolit) and Woland, who prophesies that Berlioz will die later that evening. “This interaction between Woland and Berlioz is mirrored by the trial of Yeshua by Pontius Pilate. Woland entrances Ivan and Berlioz in the story that leads up to Yeshua’s execution. In the story, Yeshua is presented as having inhuman characteristics. Woland tells this story to convince his audience of God’s existence, but the two Soviet authors refuse to believe him. Although Berlioz dismisses the prophecy as insane raving, he dies as the professor predicted. His death prophecy is witnessed by Ivan Nikolaevich Ponyrev, a young, enthusiastic, modern poet who uses the pen name Bezdomny ("homeless"). His nom de plume alludes to Maxim Gorky (Maxim the Bitter), Demyan Bedny (Demyan the Poor), and Michail Golodny (Michail the Hungry). His futile attempts to capture the "gang" (Woland and his entourage) and his warnings about their evil nature land Ivan in a lunatic  psychiatric clinic, where he is treated by Stravinsky, a local doctor. The care he receives in the clinic is very good, especially by the standards of the time. It thus serves as an important place in the novel for many characters who Woland confronts, and derives special importance from its bringing together of Ivan and the Master, an embittered author whose name connects to the title of the text. The rejection of his novel about Pontius Pilate and Christ led the Master to burn his manuscript in despair and turn his back on Margarita, his devoted lover.

The novel's first part includes satirical depictions of Massolit and Griboyedov House; Satan's magic show at a variety theatre, satirizing the vanity, greed, and gullibility of the new elite; and Woland and his retinue appropriating Berlioz's apartment after his death. (Apartmentsscarce in Moscowwere controlled by the state, and Bulgakov based the novel's apartment on his own.)

Part two introduces Margarita, the Master's mistress, who refuses to despair of her lover and his work. Azazello gives her a magical skin ointment and invites her to the Devil's midnight Good Friday ball, where Woland gives her the chance to become a witch.

Margarita enters the realm of night and learns to fly and control her unleashed passions. Natasha, her maid, accompanies her as they fly over the Soviet Union's deep forests and rivers. Margarita bathes and returns to Moscow with Azazello as the hostess of Satan's spring ball. At Koroviev's side, she welcomes dark historical figures as they arrive from Hell.

Margarita survives the ordeal, and Satan offers to grant her deepest wish and she asks for another person, she asks to free a woman she met at the ball from eternal punishment. The woman, who had been raped, murdered her child; her punishment was to wake each morning next to the handkerchief she used to smother it. Satan tells Margarita that she liberated the woman, and still has a wish to claim from him. She asks for the Master to be delivered to her and he appears, dazed and thinking he is still in the lunatic asylum. They are returned to the basement apartment which had been their love nest.

Matthew Levi delivers the verdict to Woland: the reunited couple will be sent to the afterlife. Azazello brings them a gift from Woland: a bottle of Pontius Pilate's (poisoned) wine. The Master and Margarita die; Azazello brings their souls to Satan and his retinue (awaiting them on horseback on a Moscow rooftop), and they fly away into the unknown, as cupolas and windows burn in the setting sun, leaving Earth behind and traveling into dark cosmic space. The Master and Margarita will spend eternity together in a shady, pleasant region resembling Dante Alighieri's Limbo, in a house under flowering cherry trees.

Woland and his retinue, including the Master and Margarita, become pure spirits. Moscow's authorities attribute its strange events to hysteria and mass hypnosis. In the final chapter, Woland tells the Master to finish his novel about Pontius Pilatecondemned by cowardice to limbo for eternity. The Master shouts "You are free! He is waiting for you!"; Pontius Pilate is freed, walking and talking with the Yeshua whose spirit and philosophy he had secretly admired. Moscow is now peaceful, although some experience great disquiet every May full moon. Ivan Ponyrev becomes a professor of philosophy, but he does not write poetry anymore.

Interpretations 
There are several interpretations of the novel:

 Response to aggressive atheistic propaganda
Some critics  suggest that Bulgakov was responding to poets and writers who he believed were spreading atheist propaganda in the Soviet Union, and denying Jesus Christ as a historical person. He particularly objected to the anti-religious poems of Demyan Bedny. The novel can be seen as a rebuke to the aggressively "godless people." There is justification in both the Moscow and Judaea sections of the novel for the entire image of the devil. Bulgakov uses characters from Jewish demonology as a retort to the denial of God in the USSR.

Literary critic and assistant professor at the Russian State Institute of Performing Arts Nadezhda Dozhdikova notes that the image of Jesus as a harmless madman presented in ″Master and Margarita″ has its source in the literature of the USSR of the 1920s, which, following the tradition of the demythologization of Jesus in the works of Strauss, Renan, Nietzsche and Binet-Sanglé, put forward two main themes – mental illness and deception. The mythological option, namely the denial of the existence of Jesus, only prevailed in the Soviet propaganda at the turn of the 1920s and 1930s.

 Occlusive interpretation
Bulgakov portrays evil as being as inseparable from our world as light is from darkness. Both Satan and Jesus Christ dwell mostly inside people. Jesus was unable to see Judas' treachery, despite Pilate's hints, because he saw only good in people. He couldn't protect himself, because he didn't know how, nor from whom. This interpretation presumes that Bulgakov had his own vision of Tolstoy's idea of resistance to evil through non-violence, by creating this image of Yeshua.

The Spring Festival Ball at Spaso House 

On 24 April 1935, Bulgakov was among the invited guests who attended the Spring Festival at Spaso House, the residence of the U.S. Ambassador to the Soviet Union, hosted by Ambassador William Bullitt. Critics believe Bulgakov drew from this extravagant event for his novel. In the middle of the Great Depression and Stalinist repression, Bullitt had instructed his staff to create an event that would surpass every other Embassy party in Moscow's history. The decorations included a forest of ten young birch trees in the chandelier room; a dining room table covered with Finnish tulips; a lawn made of chicory grown on wet felt; a fishnet aviary filled with pheasants, parakeets, and one hundred zebra finches, on loan from the Moscow Zoo; and a menagerie including several mountain goats, a dozen white roosters, and a baby bear.

Although Joseph Stalin didn't attend, the 400 elite guests at the festival included Foreign Minister Maxim Litvinov, Defense Minister Kliment Voroshilov, Communist Party heavyweights Nikolai Bukharin, Lazar Kaganovich, and Karl Radek, Soviet Marshals Aleksandr Yegorov, Mikhail Tukhachevsky, and Semyon Budyonny, and other high-ranking guests.

The festival lasted until the early hours of the morning. The bear became drunk on champagne given to him by Karl Radek. In the early morning hours, the zebra finches escaped from the aviary and perched below the ceilings around the house.

In his novel, Bulgakov featured the Spring Ball of the Full Moon, considered to be one of the most memorable episodes. On 29 October 2010, seventy-five years after the original ball, John Beyrle, U.S. Ambassador to the Russian Federation, hosted an Enchanted Ball at Spaso House, recreating the spirit of the original ball as a tribute to Ambassador Bullitt and Bulgakov.

Major characters

Contemporary Russians 
The Master An author who wrote a novel about the meeting of Pontius Pilate and Yeshua Ha-Notsri (Jesus of Nazareth), which was rejected by the Soviet literary bureaucracy, ruining his career. He is "detained for questioning" for three months by the secret police because of a false report by an unscrupulous neighbor. Later, he is committed to a psychiatric clinic, where Bezdomny meets him. Little else is given about this character's past other than his belief that his life began to have meaning when he met Margarita. The Master is an author surrogate for Bulgakov himself, as he represents Bulgakov’s own struggles with censorship, criticism and stifled creativity in the Soviet Union.

Margarita The Master's lover. Trapped in a passionless marriage, she devoted herself to the Master, whom she thinks may be dead. She appears briefly in the first half of the novel, but is not referred to by name until the second half, when she serves as the hostess of Satan's Grand Ball on Walpurgis Night. Her character is believed to have been inspired by Bulgakov's last wife, whom he called "my Margarita". He may also have been influenced by Faust's Gretchen, whose full name is Margarita, as well as by Queen Marguerite de Valois. The latter is featured as the main character of the opera Les Huguenots by Giacomo Meyerbeer, which Bulgakov particularly enjoyed, and Alexandre Dumas' novel, La Reine Margot. In these accounts, the queen is portrayed as daring and passionate.

Mikhail Alexandrovich Berlioz Head of the literary bureaucracy MASSOLIT. He bears the last name (Берлиоз) of French composer Hector Berlioz, who wrote the opera The Damnation of Faust. Berlioz insists that the Gospel Jesus was a mythical figure with no historical basis. Woland predicts that he will be decapitated by a young Soviet woman, which comes to pass as he gets run over by a tram.

Ivan Nikolayevich Ponyryov (Bezdomny) A young, aspiring poet. His pen name, Bezdomny (Иван Бездомный), means "homeless". Initially a willing tool of the MASSOLIT apparatus, he is transformed by the events of the novel. He witnesses Berlioz's death and nearly goes mad, but later meets The Master in an asylum where he decides to stop writing poetry.

Stephan Bogdanovich Likhodeyev Director of the Variety Theatre and Berlioz's roommate, often called by the diminutive name Styopa (Stepa). His surname is derived from the Russian word for "malfeasant". For his wicked deeds (he denounced at least five innocent people as spies so that he and Berlioz could grab their multi-bedroom apartment), he is magically teleported to Yalta, thereby freeing up the stolen apartment for Woland and his retinue.

Grigory Danilovich Rimsky Treasurer of the Variety Theatre. On the night of Woland's performance, Rimsky is ambushed by Varenukha (who has been turned into a vampire by Woland's gang) and Hella. He barely escapes the encounter and flees to the train station to get out of the city.

Ivan Savelyevich Varenukha House-manager of the Variety Theatre, whose surname refers to a traditional alcoholic fruit-punch resembling mulled wine. He is turned into a creature of darkness but is forgiven by the end of Walpurgis Night, restoring his humanity.

Natasha (Natalia Prokofyevna) Margarita's young maid, later turned into a witch.

Nikolai Ivanovich Bosoy Chairman of the House Committee at 302A Sadovaya Street (the former residence of Berlioz). For his greed and trickery, he is deceived by Korovyev and later arrested.

Maximilian Andreevich Poplavsky Uncle of Mikhail Alexandrovich Berlioz. He comes to Moscow from Kyiv in an attempt to claim Berlioz's Moscow apartment. When he arrives, he is sent home by Woland's retinue. 

George Bengalsky The master of ceremonies at the Variety Theater. Bengalsky, after commenting on black magic at Woland's performance, is beheaded by Woland's retinue. 

Doctor Stravinsky: The head of the clinic in which The Master, “Homeless,” and other characters reside, Stravinsky plays an important role in the novel. When Ivan arrives in the clinic after witnessing Berlioz’s decapitation, Stravinsky diagnoses him with Schizophrenia and Alcoholism, and insists he remains in the clinic. Ivan insists upon leaving the clinic, but Stravinsky manipulates Ivan in discussion and convinces Ivan that he must remain there.

Woland and his entourage 
Woland Woland (Воланд, also spelled as Voland) is Satan in the disguise of a "foreign professor" who is "in Moscow to present a performance of 'black magic' and then expose its machinations". Woland instead exposes the greed and bourgeois behaviour of the spectators themselves. Woland is also mentioned in Faust when Mephistopheles announces to the witches to beware because 'Squire Voland is here'.

Behemoth An enormous demonic black cat (said to be as big as a hog) who speaks, walks on two legs, and can transform into human shape for brief periods of time. He has a penchant for chess, vodka, pistols, and obnoxious sarcasm. He is evidently the least-respected member of Woland's team – Margarita boldly takes to slapping Behemoth on the head after one of his many ill-timed jokes, without fear of retaliation. In the last chapters, it appears that Behemoth is a demon pageboy, the best clown in the world. His name (Бегемот) refers to both the Biblical monster and the Russian word for hippopotamus.

Korovyev Also known as Fagotto (Фагот, meaning "bassoon" in Russian and other languages), he's described as an "ex-choirmaster", perhaps implying that he was once a member of an angelic choir. Korovyev's name is also based off the Russian word for "cow" (Корова), a reference to Charles Gonoud’s Faust, where Mephistopheles praises a "Calf of Gold". Being the only member of Woland and his entourage with a Russian name, he is Woland's assistant and translator, and is capable of creating any illusion. Unlike Behemoth and Azazello, he doesn't use violence at any point. Like Behemoth, his true form is revealed at the end: a never-smiling dark knight. In penance for a poorly made joke he was forced to assume the role of a jester; he paid off his debt by serving Satan on his Moscow journey.

Azazello Azazello (Азазелло) is a menacing, fanged, and wall-eyed member of Woland's retinue who acts as a messenger and assassin. His name may be a reference to Azazel, the fallen angel who taught people to make weapons and jewelry, and taught women the "sinful art" of painting their faces (mentioned in the pseudepigraphal Book of Enoch 8:1–3). He gives a magical cream to Margarita. He transforms into his real shape in the end: a pale-faced demon with black empty eyes.

Hella Hella (Гелла) is a beautiful, redheaded succubus. Her name may be a reference to the the Brockhaus and Efron Encyclopedic Dictionary (the Soviet equivalent of the Encyclopedia Britannica), underneath the section of “witchcraft,” where “Hella” was one of the names of premature girls who became vampires after death on the island of Lesbos. She serves as maid to Woland and his retinue. She is described as being "perfect, were it not for a purple scar on her neck", suggesting that she has been executed by hanging.

Characters from The Master's novel 
 Pontius Pilate The Roman Procurator of Judaea (a governor of a small province). The historical Pontius Pilate was the Prefect of Judaea, not the procurator. This fact was not widely known until after Bulgakov's death. He suffers terribly from migraines and loves only his dog.

 Yeshua Ha-Notsri Jesus the Nazarene (Иешуа га-Ноцри), a wanderer or "mad philosopher", as Pilate calls him. His name in Hebrew is said to mean either "Jesus who belongs to the Nazarene sect" or "Jesus who is from a place called Nazareth", though some commentators dispute the latter interpretation. In the Master's version, Yeshua describes himself as an orphan (he says "some say that my father was a Syrian"), calls everybody (even a torturer) "kind man", denies doing miracles, and has one full-time "Apostle", not twelve, among other departures from the Gospels and mainstream Christian tradition. In the Master's novel there is not a hint of the cleansing of the Temple or cursing the fig tree. The atheist regime of the novel still considers this Jesus to be offensive.

 Aphranius (or Afranius). Head of the Roman Secret Service in Judaea. That character was later an inspiration for the 1995 novel The Gospel of Afranius by Kirill Eskov.

 Niza Aphranius's henchwoman, who entices Judas to his death.

 Levi Matvei Levite, former tax collector, follower of Yeshua. Levi is introduced as a semi-fictionalized character in the Master's novel, but toward the end of The Master and Margarita, the "historical" Matthew of the Gospel appears in Moscow to deliver a message from Yeshua to Woland.

 Caiaphas Politically savvy High Priest of Judaea. Caiaphas supports the execution of Yeshua in order to "protect" the status quo ante religion, and his own status as the Chief of the Sanhedrin, from the influence of Yeshua's preachings and followers. He is considerably more aggressive towards Pilate than most accounts, and seems unconcerned by the other man's senior status.

 Banga Pilate's loyal dog. He provides Pilate with comfort and Pilate feels comfortable complaining to him about his headaches.

 Judas Iscariot A spy/informant hired by Caiaphas to assist the authorities in finding and arresting Yeshua. In contrast to the Gospels' version, in which Judas is a long-time member of Jesus's "inner circle" of Apostles, Bulgakov's Judas (of Karioth) meets Yeshua for the first time less than 48 hours before betraying him. He is paid off by Caiaphas, but is later assassinated on Pilate's orders for his role in Yeshua's death.

Themes and imagery 
The novel deals with the interplay of good and evil, innocence and guilt, courage and cowardice, exploring such issues as the responsibility towards truth when authority would deny it, and freedom of the spirit in an unfree world. Love and sensuality are also dominant themes in the novel.

Margarita's devotional love for the Master leads her to leave her husband, but she emerges victorious. Her spiritual union with the Master is also a sexual one. The novel is a riot of sensual impressions, but the emptiness of sensual gratification without love is emphasized in the satirical passages. Rejecting sensuality for the sake of empty respectability is pilloried in the figure of Nikolai Ivanovich, who becomes Natasha's hog-broomstick.

The interplay of fire, water, destruction, and other natural forces provides a constant accompaniment to the events of the novel, as do light and darkness, noise and silence, sun and moon, storms and tranquility, and other powerful polarities. There is a complex relationship between Jerusalem and Moscow throughout the novel, sometimes polyphony, sometimes counterpoint.

Bulgakov employs Aesopian language in order to criticize the hypocrisy of Soviet society. He makes a commentary on the flaws of Soviet society by referencing distinct issues such as the housing crisis, corruption and the secret police. His methodology of introducing characters that benefit from the new regime, and then punishing them for their sins through Woland displays his condemnation of the conditions in the 1930s Soviet Union. An issue that is particularly emphasized in the novel is censorship, literary repression and suppression of creativity. Bulgakov’s portrayal of Massolit writers and their luxurious, extravagant lifestyles is a mockery of their real-life counterparts such as Vladimir Mayakovsky. The novel is a satirical critique of the Soviet regime that condemns the decline of humanity's virtues, through its portrayal of secondary characters.

The novel is deeply influenced by Goethe's Faust, and its themes of cowardice, trust, intellectual curiosity, and redemption are prominent. It can be read on many different levels, as hilarious slapstick, deep philosophical allegory, and biting socio-political satire critical of not just the Soviet system but also the superficiality and vanity of modern life in general. Jazz is presented with an ambivalent fascination and revulsion. But the novel is full of modern elements, such as the model asylum, radio, street and shopping lights, cars, lorries, trams, and air travel. There is little evident nostalgia for any "good old days" – the only figure who mentions Tsarist Russia is Satan. It also has strong elements of what in the later 20th century was called magic realism.

Allusions and references to other works 
The novel is influenced by the Faust legend, particularly the first part of the Goethe interpretation, The Devil's Pact, which goes back to the 4th century; Christopher Marlowe's Dr Faustus (where in the last act the hero cannot burn his manuscript or receive forgiveness from a loving God); and the libretto of the opera whose music was composed by Charles Gounod. Also of influence is Louis Hector Berlioz who wrote the opera La damnation de Faust. In this opera there are four characters: Faust (tenor), the devil Méphistophélès (baritone), Marguerite (mezzo-soprano) and Brander (bass). And also the Symphonie Fantastique where the hero dreams of his own decapitation and attending a witches' sabbath. 

Satirical poetics of Nikolai Gogol and Mikhail Saltykov-Shchedrin are seen as an influence, as is the case in other Bulgakov novels. Bulgakov perceived and embodied the principles of Gogol's and Saltykov-Shchedrin's world perception through the comic mixing of absurd, ghostly and real. Technical progress and the rapid development of mechanized production in the 20th century, combined with the satirical motive of primitivism, characteristic of Russian literature, left an imprint on the nature of Bulgakov's grotesque.

The dialogue between Pontius Pilate and Yeshua Ha-Notsri is strongly influenced by Fyodor Dostoyevsky's parable "The Grand Inquisitor" from The Brothers Karamazov. The "luckless visitors chapter" refers to Tolstoy's Anna Karenina: "everything became jumbled in the Oblonsky household". The theme of the Devil exposing society as an apartment block, as it could be seen if the entire façade would be removed, has some precedents in El diablo cojuelo (1641, The Lame Devil or The Crippled Devil) by the Spaniard Luís Vélez de Guevara. (This was adapted to 18th-century France by Alain-René Lesage's 1707 Le Diable boiteux.)

English translations 
The novel has been translated several times into English: 
 Mirra Ginsburg's 1967 version for Grove Press
 Michael Glenny's November 1967 version for Harper and Row and Harvill Press
 Diana Burgin and Katherine Tiernan O'Connor's 1993 version for Ardis Publishing
 Richard Pevear and Larissa Volokhonsky's 1997 version for Penguin Books
 Michael Karpelson's 2006 version for Lulu Press and Wordsworth
 Hugh Aplin's 2008 version for Oneworld Publications
 John Dougherty's 2017 version for Russian Tumble 
 Sergei Khramtsov-Templar's 2000 version (non-published, catalogued with the Library of Congress)

The early translation by Glenny runs more smoothly than that of the modern translations; some Russian-speaking readers consider it to be the only one creating the desired effect, though it may take liberties with the text. The modern translators pay for their attempted closeness by losing idiomatic flow. Literary writer Kevin Moss considers the early translations by Ginsburg and Glenny to be hurried, and lacking much critical depth. As an example, he claims that the more idiomatic translations miss Bulgakov's "crucial" reference to the devil in Berlioz's thoughts (original: "Пожалуй, пора бросить все к черту и в Кисловодск…"):
 "I ought to drop everything and run down to Kislovodsk." (Ginsburg)
 "I think it's time to chuck everything up and go and take the waters at Kislovodsk." (Glenny)
 "It's time to throw everything to the devil and go off to Kislovodsk." (Burgin and Tiernan O'Connor)
 "It's time to send it all to the devil and go to Kislovodsk." (Pevear and Volokhonsky)
 "To hell with everything, it's time to take that Kislovodsk vacation." (Karpelson)
 "It's time to let everything go to the devil and be off to Kislovodsk." (Aplin)
 "It's time to throw it all to the devil and go to Kislovodsk." (John Dougherty)

Several literary critics hailed the Burgin/Tiernan O’Connor translation as the most accurate and complete English translation, particularly when read in tandem with the matching annotations by Bulgakov's biographer, Ellendea Proffer. However, these judgements predate translations by Pevear & Volokhonsky, Karpelson, Aplin, and Dougherty. The Karpelson translation, even when republished in the UK by Wordsworth, has not been Anglicised, and retains North American spellings and idioms.

Cultural influence 
The book was listed in Le Mondes 100 Books of the Century. Also, when asked by Tyler Cowen, "What’s your favorite novel?" the technologist Peter Thiel answered, "If you want something a little more intellectual, it’s probably the Bulgakov novel The Master and Margarita where the devil shows up in Stalinist Russia, and succeeds, and gives everybody what they want, and everything goes haywire. It’s hard, because no one believes he’s real."

"Manuscripts don't burn" 
A memorable and much-quoted line in The Master and Margarita is: "manuscripts don't burn". The Master is a writer who is plagued both by his own mental problems and the harsh political criticism faced by most Soviet writers in 1930s Moscow in the Stalinist Soviet Union He burns his treasured manuscript in an effort to cleanse his mind from the troubles the work has brought him. When they finally meet, Woland asks to see the Master's novel; the Master apologizes for not being able to do so, as he had burnt it. Woland to him saying, "You can't have done. Manuscripts don't burn." There is a deeply autobiographical element reflected in this passage. Bulgakov burned an early copy of The Master and Margarita for much the same reasons as he expresses in the novel. Also this may refer to Christopher Marlowe's Dr. Faustus where the hero, deviating from previous tales of 'The Devil's Pact', is unable to burn his books or repent to a merciful God.

Bulgakov museums in Moscow 
In Moscow, two museums honor the memory of Mikhail Bulgakov and The Master and Margarita. Both are located in Bulgakov's former apartment building on Bolshaya Sadovaya Street, No. 10. Since the late 1980s and the fall of the Soviet Union, the building has become a gathering spot for Bulgakov fans, as well as Moscow-based Satanist groups. Over the years they have filled the walls with graffiti. The best drawings were usually kept as the walls were repainted, so that several layers of different colored paints could be seen around them. In 2003, all of the numerous paintings, quips, and drawings were completely whitewashed.

The two museums are rivals: the official Museum M.A. Bulgakov, although established second, identifies as "the first and only Memorial Museum of Mikhail Bulgakov in Moscow".

 Bulgakov House

The Bulgakov House is situated on the ground floor of the building. This museum was established as a private initiative on 15 May 2004. It contains personal belongings, photos, and several exhibitions related to Bulgakov's life and his different works. Various poetic and literary events are often held. The museum organises tours of Bulgakov's Moscow, some of which have re-enactors playing characters of The Master and Margarita. The Bulgakov House also operates the Theatre M.A. Bulgakov and the Café 302-bis.

 Museum M.A. Bulgakov

In apartment number 50 on the fourth floor is the Museum M.A. Bulgakov ( А. Булгаков). This facility is a government initiative, founded on 26 March 2007. It contains personal belongings, photos, and several exhibitions related to Bulgakov's life and his different works. Various poetic and literary events are often held here.

Allusions and references 
Various authors and musicians have credited The Master and Margarita as inspiration for certain works.
 Mick Jagger of The Rolling Stones was inspired by the novel in writing the song "Sympathy for the Devil". Will Self's foreword to the Vintage edition of the Michael Glenny translation of the novel suggests the same, and Jagger's then girlfriend Marianne Faithfull confirmed it in an interview with Sylvie Simmons from the magazine Mojo in 2005. Jagger says so himself in the Stones documentary Crossfire Hurricane.
 The grunge band Pearl Jam were influenced by the novel's confrontation between Jesus and Pontius Pilate in their song, "Pilate", on their 1998 album Yield.
 The Canadian band The Tea Party has a song named "The Master and Margarita".
 Surrealist artist H. R. Giger named a 1976 painting after the novel. The band Danzig featured this painting on the cover of their 1992 album Danzig III: How the Gods Kill.
 The title song on Patti Smith's album Banga refers to Pontius Pilate and his dog Banga as portrayed in The Master and Margarita.
 Master Margherita - musical band from Switzerland.
 Several songs written by the Chicago punk band The Lawrence Arms, for example "Chapter 13: The Hero Appears" from the 2003 album The Greatest Story Ever Told.
 Russian writers Arkady and Boris Strugatsky were heavily influenced by this novel when writing several of their books. Аmong them are such works as Snail on the Slope, Limping Fate, Overburdened with Evil and others.

Adaptations

Live action films 
1970: The Finnish director Seppo Wallin made the movie Pilatus for the series Teatterituokio (Theatre Sessions) from the Finnish public broadcasting company, based on the biblical part of the book.
 1971: the Polish director Andrzej Wajda made the movie Pilate and Others for the German TV, based on the biblical part of the book ('The Master's manuscript').
 1972: The joint Italian-Yugoslavian production of Aleksandar Petrović's The Master and Margaret (Italian: Il Maestro e Margherita, Serbo-Croatian: Majstor i Margarita) was released. Based loosely on the book, in the movie the Master is named Nikolaj Afanasijevic Maksudov, while in the original book the Master is anonymous.
 1989: Director Roman Polanski was approached by Warner Bros. to adapt and direct Bulgakov's novel. The project was subsequently dropped by Warner Bros. due to budgetary concerns and the studio's belief that the subject matter was no longer relevant due to the fall of the Berlin Wall. Polanski has described his script as the best he has ever adapted.
 1992: In the adaptation called Incident in Judaea by Paul Bryers, only the Yeshua story is told. The film includes a prologue which mentions Bulgakov and the other storylines. The cast includes John Woodvine, Mark Rylance, Lee Montague and Jim Carter. The film was distributed by Brook Productions and Channel 4.
 1994: A Russian movie adaptation of the novel was made by Yuri Kara. Although the cast included big names and talented actors (Anastasiya Vertinskaya as Margarita, Mikhail Ulyanov as Pilate, Nikolai Burlyayev as Yeshua, Valentin Gaft as Woland, Aleksandr Filippenko as Korovyev-Fagotto) and its score was by the noted Russian composer Alfred Schnittke, the movie was not released on any media. The grandson of Bulgakov's third wife Elena Sergeevna Shilovskaya claimed, as a self-assigned heir, the rights on Bulgakov's literary inheritance and refused the release. Since 2006, copies of the movie have existed on DVD. Some excerpts can be viewed on the Master and Margarita website. The movie was finally released in cinemas in 2011.
 1996: The Russian director Sergey Desnitsky and his wife, the actress Vera Desnitskaya, made the film Master i Margarita. Disappointed by the responses of the Russian media, they decided not to release the film for distribution.
 2003: The Iranian director, Kamal Tabrizi, made the movie Sometimes Look at the Sky loosely based on The Master and Margarita.
 2005: The Hungarian director Ibolya Fekete made a short film of 26 minutes, entitled A Mester és Margarita. This film, with such noted Russian and Hungarian actors as Sergey Grekov, Grigory Lifanov, and Regina Myannik, was broadcast by MTV Premier on 5 October 2005.
 2008: The Italian director Giovanni Brancale made the film Il Maestro e Margherita, set in contemporary Florence.
 2013: The American producer Scott Steindorff had bought the rights to make the film The Master and Margarita. Many names of possible directors and actors were rumored. Caroline Thompson (The Addams Family, Edward Scissorhands, Black Beauty) was hired to write the script. In 2017, Steindorff announced that he had stopped the project. A little later, the Russian press agency TASS announced that the screen adaptation rights for The Master and Margarita had been granted to Svetlana Migunova-Dali, co-owner of the Moscow-based production house Logos Film, and Grace Loh, who is the head of the production company New Crime Productions in Hollywood.
2017: The French director Charlotte Waligòra made the film Le maître et Marguerite in which she played the role of Margarita herself. The other characters are interpreted by Michel Baibabaeff (Woland), Vadim Essaïan (Behemoth), Hatem Taïeb (Jesus) and Giovanni Marino Luna (The Master).
2018: The Russian director Nikolai Lebedev started preparing the film Master i Margarita: he wrote the script himself and was to start shooting the film with a budget of 800 million roubles (10.5 million euro) in April 2019. The director was later changed to Mikhail Lockshin, and the title to «Woland». Filming began in July 2021 and concluded in November 2021. The film is set to be released in the end of 2022.
2019: In December 2019, Deadline reported that Baz Luhrmann had acquired the rights to the book, with himself producing the film as well as directing. The release date is currently unknown.

Soundtracks 
Ennio Morricone, Alfred Schnittke and Igor Kornelyuk have composed soundtracks for films of The Master and Margarita.

Animated films 
 2002: the French animators Clément Charmet and Elisabeth Klimoff made an animation of the first and third chapter of The Master and Margarita based on Jean-François Desserre's graphic novel.
 2010: Israeli director Terentij Oslyabya made an animation film The Master and Margarita, Chapter 1. His movie literally illustrates the novel.
 2012: The Russian animation filmmaker Rinat Timerkaev started working on a full-length animated film Master i Margarita. On his blog, Timerkaev informed followers in 2015 that he would not continue working on it due to expenses. He had already released a trailer, which can be seen on YouTube.
2015: The Finnish animation filmmaker  started working on a full-length animated puppet film Mistr a Markétka, a Finnish-Czech coproduction. A 5-minute trailer was shown on 2 June 2015 at the Zlín Film Festival in the Czech Republic.
2017: The Russian animation filmmaker Alexander Golberg Jero started working on a full-length animated film Master i Margarita. Media entrepreneur and co-producer Matthew Helderman, CEO of BondIt Media Capital, is responsible for collecting the necessary funds.

Many students of art schools found inspiration in The Master and Margarita to make short animated movies. A full list is available on the Master & Margarita website.

Television 
 1988: The Polish director Maciej Wojtyszko produced Mistrz i Małgorzata, a TV miniseries of four episodes.
 1989: the Russian theatre director  adapted his theatre play Master i Margarita for television. As suggested by the subtitle, "Chapters from the novel": the film covers part of the novel; 21 chapters were adapted in a miniseries.
 2005: Russian director Vladimir Bortko, noted for his TV adaptations of Bulgakov's Heart of a Dog and Dostoyevsky's The Idiot, made a Master and Margarita TV series of ten episodes (2005). It stars Aleksandr Galibin as The Master, Anna Kovalchuk as Margarita, Oleg Basilashvili as Woland, Aleksandr Abdulov as Korovyev-Fagotto, Vladislav Galkin as Bezdomny, Kirill Lavrov as Pontius Pilate, Valentin Gaft as Caiaphas, and Sergey Bezrukov as Yeshua.

Radio 
The novel has been adapted by Lucy Catherine, with music by Stephen Warbeck, for broadcast on BBC Radio 3 on 15 March 2015.

Comic strips and graphic novels 
Several graphic novels have been adapted from this work, by the following:
 1997: Russian comic strip author Rodion Tanaev
 2002: French comic strip author Jean-François Desserre
 2005: Russian comic strip authors Askold Akishine and Misha Zaslavsky
 2008: London-based comic strip authors Andrzej Klimowski and Danusia Schejbal.
 2013: The Austrian/French comic strip author Bettina Egger created a graphic novel adaptation entitled Moscou endiablé, sur les traces de Maître et Marguerite. It interweaves the story of 'The Master and Margarita' with elements of Bulgakov's life, and her own exploration of the sources of the novel in Moscow.

Theatre 
The Master and Margarita has been adapted on stage by more than 500 theatre companies all over the world. A full list of all versions and languages is published on the Master & Margarita website.
 1971: from 1971 to 1977, all theatre adaptations of The Master and Margarita were Polish. They were prohibited from using the title The Master and Margarita. Titles included Black Magic and Its Exposure (Kraków, 1971), Black Magic (Katowice, 1973), Have You Seen Pontius Pilate? (Wrocław, 1974), and Patients (Wroclaw, 1976).
 1977: An adaptation for the Russian stage was produced by the director Yuri Lyubimov at Moscow's Taganka Theatre.
 1978: a stage adaptation was directed by Romanian-born American director Andrei Șerban at the New York Public Theater, starring John Shea. This seems to be the version revived in 1993 (see below).
 1980: stage production (Maestrul și Margareta) directed by Romanian stage director Cătălina Buzoianu at The Little Theatre ("Teatrul mic") in Bucharest, Romania. Cast: Ștefan Iordache as "Master"/"Yeshua Ha-Notsri"; Valeria Seciu as "Margareta"; Dan Condurache as "Woland"; Mitică Popescu as "Koroviev"; Gheorghe Visu as "Ivan Bezdomny"/"Matthew Levi"; Sorin Medeleni as "Behemoth".
 1982: stage production (Mästaren och Margarita) directed by Swedish stage director Peter Luckhaus at the National Theatre of Sweden Dramaten in Stockholm, Sweden – Cast: Rolf Skoglund as "Master", Margaretha Byström as "Margareta", Jan Blomberg as "Woland", Ernst-Hugo Järegård as "Berlioz"/"Stravinskij"/"Pontius Pilate", Stellan Skarsgård as "Koroviev", and Örjan Ramberg as "Ivan"/"Levi Mattei".
 1983: stage production Saatana saapuu Moskovaan directed by Laura Jäntti for KOM-teatteri in Helsinki, Finland. 
 1991: UK premiere of an adaptation at the London Academy of Music and Dramatic Art. 3rd year professional diploma course. Director Helena Kaut-Howson. Cast includes: Katherine Kellgren, James Harper, Paul Cameron, Zen Gesner, Kirsten Clark, Polly Hayes, Abigail Hercules, Clive Darby, and Daniel Philpot.
 1992: adaptation at the Lyric Hammersmith in June by the Four Corners theatre company. It was based on a translation by Michael Denny, adapted and directed for the stage by David Graham-Young (of Contemporary Stage). The production transferred to the Almeida Theatre in July 1992.
 1993: the Theatre for the New City produced a revival stage adaptation in New York City, as originally commissioned by Joseph Papp and the Public Theater. The adaptation was by Jean-Claude van Itallie. It was directed by David Willinger and featured a cast of 13, including Jonathan Teague Cook as "Woland", Eric Rasmussen as "Matthew Levi", Cesar Rodriguez as "Yeshua Ha Nozri", Eran Bohem as "The Master" and Lisa Moore as "Margarita". This version was published by Dramatists Play Service, Inc. A French version, using part of van Itallie's text, was performed at the Théâtre de Mercure, Paris, directed by Andrei Serban.
 1994: stage production at Montreal's Centaur Theatre, adapted and directed by Russian-Canadian director Alexandre Marine.
 2000: the Israeli theater company Gesher premiered haSatan baMoskva, a musical based on the 1999 Hebrew translation of the novel. The production included song lyrics by Ehud Manor and a 23-musician orchestra. It was directed by Yevgeny Arye and starred Haim Topol, Evgeny Gamburg and Israel "Sasha" Demidov (as noted in the company history).
 A German-language stage adaptation of the novel, Der Meister und Margarita, directed by Frank Castorf, premiered at the 2002 Vienna Festival, Austria.
 2004: an adaptation of the novel by Edward Kemp and directed by Steven Pimlott was staged in July 2004 at the Chichester Festival Theatre, UK. The cast included Samuel West as "The Master" and Michael Feast as "Woland". The production included incidental music by Jason Carr.
 2004: the National Youth Theatre produced a new stage adaptation by David Rudkin at the Lyric Hammersmith London, directed by John Hoggarth. It featured a cast of 35 and ran from 23 August to 11 September. In 2005, Rudkin's adaptation received a production with a cast of 13 from Aberystwyth University's Department of Theatre, Film and Television Studies at the Theatr y Castell, directed by David Ian Rabey.
 In October 2006, it was staged by Grinnell College, directed by Veniamin Smekhov.
 In 2006, an almost 5-hour long adaptation was staged by Georgian director Avtandil Varsimashvili.
 In 2007, Helsinki, Finland, the group theatre Ryhmäteatteri staged a production named Saatana saapuu Moskovaan (Satan comes to Moscow), directed by Finnish director Esa Leskinen. Eleven actors played 26 separate roles in a three-hour production during the season 25 September 2007 – 1 March 2008.
 In 2007, Alim Kouliev in Hollywood with The Master Project production started rehearsals on stage with his own adaptation of Bulgakov's novel The Master and Margarita. The premier was scheduled for 14 October 2007, but was postponed. Some excerpts and information can be viewed on the Master and Margarita website. 
 In 2008, a Swedish stage production of Mästaren och Margarita directed by Leif Stinnerbom was performed at Stockholms stadsteater, starring Philip Zandén (The Master), Frida Westerdahl (Margarita), Jakob Eklund (Woland) and Ingvar Hirdwall (Pilate).
 In 2010, a new, original stage translation, written by Max Hoehn and Raymond Blankenhorn, was used by the Oxford University Dramatic Society Summer Tour, performing in Oxford, Battersea Arts Centre in London, and at C Venues at the Edinburgh Festival Fringe.
 In 2011, Complicite premiered its new adaptation, directed by Simon McBurney at Theatre Royal Plymouth. It toured to Luxembourg, London, Madrid, Vienna, Recklinghausen, Amsterdam. In July 2012 it toured to the Festival d'Avignon and the Grec Festival in Barcelona.
 In October 2013, Lodestar Theatre premiered a new adaptation by Max Rubin at the Unity Theatre, Liverpool.
 December 2015, Macedonian National Theater (Skopje, North Macedonia). Director: Ivan Popovski.
 In August 2016, Sleepless Theatre Company performed a revised adaptation of the book at the Edinburgh Festival Fringe at St Cuthbert's Church.
In 2018, Ljubljana Puppet Theatre premiered a special production, composed of two distinct parts (also directed by two separate artists): an interactive theatrical journey through the theatre building including visual art, entitled The Devil's Triptych, and a separate "theatrical gospel" named Margareta (Margarita), both taking place simultaneously inside and in front of the theatre building (thus theatregoers are required to visit on multiple occasions should they wish to experience the totality of the production). This adaptation premiered in June 2018 to favourable reviews.

Ballet and dance 
In 2003, the Perm Opera and Ballet Theatre, Russia, presented Master i Margarita, a new full-length ballet set to music by Gustav Mahler, Dmitri Shostakovich, Hector Berlioz, Astor Piazzolla and other composers. Choreography and staging by David Avdysh, set design by Simon Pastukh (USA) and costume design by Galina Solovyova (USA). 
In 2007, the National Opera of Ukraine, Kyiv, premiered David Avdysh's The Master and Margarita, a ballet-phantasmagoria in two acts.
2010: Synetic Theater of Arlington, VA, presented a dance/performance adaptation of The Master and Margarita directed by Paata Tsikurishvili and choreographed by Irina Tsikurishvili. The show featured a cast of 16, including Paata Tsikurishvili as Master and Irina Tsikurishvili as Margarita. It ran for one month at the Lansburgh Theatre.
In 2015, Estonian theatre Vanemuine premiered a dance adaptation "Meister ja Margarita", directed by Janek Savolainen.
In 2021, the Bolshoi Ballet premiered a new full-length ballet named Master and Margarita, set to music by Alfred Schnitke and Milko Lazar, conducted by Anton Grishanin. Choreography by Edward Clug, set design by Marko Japelj, costume design by Leo Kulaš and lighting design by Tomaž Premzl.

Music 
Hundreds of composers, bands, singers and songwriters were inspired by The Master and Margarita in their work. Some 250 songs or musical pieces have been counted about it.

Rock music 
More than 35 rock bands and artists, including The Rolling Stones, Patti Smith, Franz Ferdinand and Pearl Jam, have been inspired by the novel.

Pop music 
In pop music, more than 15 popular bands and artists, including Igor Nikolayev, Valery Leontiev, Zsuzsa Koncz, Larisa Dolina and Linda, have been inspired by the novel. Valery Leontiev's song "Margarita" was the basis of the first Russian music video, produced in 1989.

Russian bards 
Many Russian bards, including Alexander Rosenbaum, have been inspired by the novel to write songs about it. They have based more than 200 songs on themes and characters from The Master and Margarita.

Classical music 
A dozen classical composers, including Dmitri Smirnov and Andrey Petrov, have been inspired by the novel to write symphonies and musical phantasies about it.

2011: Australian composer and domra (Russian mandolin) player Stephen Lalor presented his "Master & Margarita Suite" of instrumental pieces in concert at the Bulgakov Museum Moscow in July 2011, performed on the Russian instruments domra, cimbalom, bass balalaika, and bayan.

Opera and musical theatre 
More than 15 composers, including York Höller, Alexander Gradsky and Sergei Slonimsky, have made operas and musicals on the theme of The Master and Margarita.
 1972: 3-act chamber opera The Master and Margarita by Russian composer Sergei Slonimsky was completed, but not allowed to be performed or published. It premiered in concert in Moscow on 20 May 1989, and the score was released in 1991. An abridged Western premiere of this work was produced in Hanover, Germany in June 2000.
 1977: A musical adaptation (under the title "Satan's Ball") written by Richard Crane and directed by his wife Faynia Williams was presented at the Edinburgh Fringe Festival by the University of Bradford Drama Group at Bedlam Theatre. It won a Fringe First award, and garnered excellent reviews.
 1989: The German composer York Höller's opera Der Meister und Margarita was premiered in 1989 at the Paris Opéra and released on CD in 2000.
 On 25 August 2006, Andrew Lloyd Webber announced intentions to adapt the novel as a stage musical or opera. In 2007, it was reported by Stage that he had abandoned that work.
 In late 2009, a Russian singer and composer Alexander Gradsky released a 4-CD opera adaptation of the novel. It stars Gradsky as the Master, Woland, Yeshua and Behemoth; Nikolai Fomenko as Koroviev, Mikhail Seryshev (formerly of Master) as Ivan; Elena Minina as Margarita; and many renowned Russian singers and actors in episodic roles, including (but not limited to) Iosif Kobzon, Lyubov Kazarnovskaya, Andrei Makarevich, Alexander Rosenbaum, Arkady Arkanov, Gennady Khazanov and the late Georgi Millyar (voice footage from one of his movies was used).

Other music 
Five alternative composers and performers, including Simon Nabatov, have been inspired by the novel to present various adaptations.

In 2009, Portuguese new media artists Video Jack premiered an audiovisual art performance inspired by the novel at Kiasma, Helsinki, as part of the PixelAche Festival. Since then, it has been shown in festivals in different countries, having won an honorable mention award at Future Places Festival, Porto. The project was released as a net art version later that year.

See also

 Azazel in popular culture
 Big Read (Bulgaria)
 Big Read (Hungarian)
 Christian literature
 Devil in popular culture
 Fantastic
 Le Monde 100 Books of the Century
 List of works published posthumously
 Magic realism
 Surrealism
 The Big Read
 Urban fantasy
 Wayland the Smith
 Works based on Faust

Notes

References

Bibliography

External links 

  Website devoted solely to Bulgakov's Master and Margarita.
 
 
  in three languages.
 
 
  A comparison of the Soviet society described in Master and Margarita and modern society in the United States and Russia.
 
 
  Useful introduction with much illustrative material.

 

 

Russian comedy novels
Russian novels adapted into films
Russian novels adapted into plays
Novels adapted into comics
Novels adapted into operas
Novels adapted into radio programs
Russian novels adapted into television shows
Soviet novels
Novels first published in serial form
Novels by Mikhail Bulgakov
Russian satirical novels
Modernist novels
Novelistic portrayals of Jesus
Novels set in Moscow
Novels published posthumously
Works originally published in Russian magazines
Novels set in the Stalin era
Russian magic realism novels
20th-century Russian novels
Cultural depictions of Judas Iscariot
Cultural depictions of Pontius Pilate
Caiaphas
Russian political satire
Censored books
Walpurgis Night fiction
Novels adapted into ballets
Limbo